Falsocularia annulicornis is a species of beetle in the family Cerambycidae, and the only species in the genus Falsocularia. It was described by Breuning in 1942.

References

Dorcaschematini
Beetles described in 1942